The 17th TCA Awards were presented by the Television Critics Association. Christopher Titus hosted the ceremony on July 21, 2001 at the Ritz-Carlton Huntington Hotel and Spa in Pasadena, Calif.

Winners and nominees

Multiple wins 
The following shows received multiple wins:

Multiple nominations 
The following shows received multiple nominations:

References

External links 
 Official website 
 2001 TCA Awards at IMDb.com

2001 television awards
2001 in American television
TCA Awards ceremonies